Robert Fink may refer to:

 Robert Morgan Fink (1915–2012), American biochemistry professor at UCLA
 Robert O. Fink (1905–1988), American papyrologist
 Doctor Fink (born 1957), stage name of Matthew Robert Fink, American musician